Jennie M. Forehand (born December 17, 1935) is an American businesswoman and former legislator who has served 15 years in the Maryland Senate, representing Rockville, Gaithersburg, and Garrett Park. She previously served  four terms in the Maryland House of Delegates.

Early life
Jennie M. Forehand was born in Nashville, Tennessee on December 17, 1935. She attended the Woman's College of the University of North Carolina in Greensboro, North Carolina. Forehand also attended the University of North Carolina at Chapel Hill, receiving her Bachelor of Science degree in Industrial Relations in 1958.

Career
Forehand founded Forehand Antiques and Interiors and has worked as a teacher, juvenile court probation counselor, and statistician.

Political career

Forehand represented Montgomery County and its 17th district in the Maryland House of Delegates between 1978 and 1994. She then served on the Maryland Senate from January 11, 1995 to January 14, 2015.

Issues

Transportation

Forehand keeps transportation issues "on the front burner" for citizens and public officials. She serves on the MD-DC-VA Regional Transportation Planning Board overseeing the strategic development and federal funding for the area's rail and roadway development.  One key regional transportation roadway, the Inter-County Connector (ICC), has begun construction after years of delay, thanks in no small part to Forehand's unwavering advocacy in the Legislature.

Health
Forehand also has a passion for health related issues. She played a leading role in making Maryland "smoke-free," gaining recognition from the American Cancer Society for her efforts. She was the first State legislator in the nation to propose prohibiting genetic-based discrimination in health insurance and in the workplace.

Leveraging her experience on Montgomery County's Health Planning Commission, Forehand's active support for the strategic expansion of local health care resources such as Adventist Hospital ensures that community health care needs are met. As a Director on the Board of Hospice Caring, she helped create this facility, a haven for individuals facing the end of life and their families.

A strong advocate for mental health services, Forehand has given many speeches on depression as the result of her mother's recovery from severe clinical depression. She was a "founding mother" of Rockville's JLG Regional Institute for Children and Adolescents (RICA), a highly regarded, community-based, clinical and educational facility serving those with severe emotional disabilities.

Economic development
As a legislator, Forehand has a knack for recognizing early on the technologies and trends that will affect her constituents and the State economy.

She was a very early advocate for the fledgling biotechnology industry and vigorously promoted its economic potential for Montgomery County, introducing legislation to promote venture capital investment in start-up companies and facilitate community-based "business incubators.

Environment
A supporter of Program Open Space to protect park and recreation areas in the State, Forehand was there at the beginning as this program took shape.  As recently as 2009, she successfully fought on the Senate floor against restrictions that would have devastated POS programs in her district.

Forehand served on the Department of Environment's Task Force on Attaining Federal Air Quality Standards and is responsible for the first pilot program to test emission from diesel trucks.  She continues to cosponsor and work for environmental legislation in the Senate.

Women
Senator Forehand is past president of the Women's Legislative Network of the National Conference of State Legislatures (NCSL) and past president of the Women Legislators of Maryland.

Early on in her career, Forehand took the lead on issues including domestic violence, day care access, family leave, child support, reproductive freedom and greater representation of women in the judiciary. Her efforts won her recognition as a "Trailblazer" from the Women's Bar Association and put her into the Maryland's Top 100 Women Circle of Excellence.

Retirement
Senator Forehand did not run for re-election in 2014 and retired in January 2015.

Personal life
She is married and had two children. She lives in Rockville.

Awards 

2009 Maryland Department of Transportation Champion of Traffic Safety

2008 National Institutes of Health Director's Award for Leadership & Biosafety Oversight Maryland Municipal League Municipal Super Star Award

2007 Washington Regional Alcohol Program (WRAP) Award

2006 Greater Washington Society for Clinical Social Work MD State Senator of the Year; UMBI Biotechnology Leadership Award

2005 Citizens' Review Board for Children Champion for Children Award; Montgomery County Department of Health and Human Services Clean Air Advocate

2003 Montgomery County Business and Professional Women Woman of the Year

2003 Daily Record Maryland's Top 100 Women Circle of Excellence (for being named to Maryland's Top 100 Women three times); Rockville Chamber of Commerce Citizen of the Year  Maryland Impaired Driving Coalition Distinguished Legislator Award

2002 MADD Award of Excellence; American Cancer Society True Champion; Montgomery County Chamber of Commerce Outstanding Transportation Leader of the Year

2001 Metropolitan Washington Board of Trade Leader of the Year; Marylanders for Efficient and Safe Highways Transportation Advocate of the Year Award; American Association of University Women Educational Foundation Award

1999 Daily Record Maryland's Top 100 Women; Maryland Municipal League Award

1998 MD State's Attorneys Association Senator of the Year; Asbury Village President's Award for Service; The Greater Washington Board of Trade Intercounty Connector Award

1996 American Massage Therapy Association, Maryland Chapter Award; Montgomery County Medical Society Legislator of the Year

1995 MADD for drunk driving legislation; Maryland Heritage Museums Humanities Award; Hospice Caring, Inc. Special Recognition

1994 RICA Award for Outstanding Voluntary Service

1993 Women's Bar Association's Margaret Brent Trailblazer Award

1993 Suburban Maryland High Technology Council Technology Leadership Award; Montgomery County Medical Society Outstanding Legislator of the Year

1992 Maryland Planned Parenthood Public Affairs Award

1991 Shady Grove Adventist Hospital Community Service Award

1990 Montgomery County Association of Realtors Partners In Housing Award; Montgomery County Maryland Proclamation in Recognition of Work on Program Open Space

1988 RICA Citizens' Advisory Board Outstanding Leadership; Maryland Association of Psychosocial Services Legislator Honor Roll; Montgomery County Arts Council Outstanding Advocate Award

1987 Johns Hopkins University Peabody Medallion Award

1986 American Lung Association of Maryland Award; Maryland College of Art and Design President's Award

External links 

 Jennie M. Forehand papers at the University of Maryland Libraries

References

1935 births
Politicians from Nashville, Tennessee
Living people
Democratic Party Maryland state senators
Democratic Party members of the Maryland House of Delegates
University of North Carolina at Chapel Hill alumni
Women state legislators in Maryland
21st-century American politicians
21st-century American women politicians